James Whittico Jr. (November 18, 1915 – August 21, 2018) was an American physician from St. Louis, Missouri.  He was the first African American named a full clinical professor at any medical school in St. Louis and was the fourth African American in St. Louis to be named a fellow for the American College of Surgeons.  Whittico was in the private practice of medicine specializing in surgery from 1952 until 2015.

Born in Williamson, West Virginia, he followed his father James Whittico Sr. into the career of medicine. James Whittico Jr. attended Lincoln University of Pennsylvania, the nation's oldest historically black university.  He entered Meharry Medical College, a historically black medical school in Nashville at the age of 19.  One of his mentors was Matthew Walker Sr.  He graduated medical school in 1940 and trained at St. Louis' Homer G. Phillips Hospital which was the largest hospital which offered training for doctors of color.

Whittico was a clinical instructor of surgery at Washington University School of Medicine and served six St. Louis hospitals as chief of staff or chief of surgery. He was also Missouri's first African American to become a military hospital chief surgeon in active combat during World War II, serving in the Southwest Pacific Theater with the U.S. 93rd Infantry Division and rising to the rank of lieutenant colonel. Whittico was also a member of Chi Delta Mu.

References 

1915 births
2018 deaths
20th-century American physicians
American surgeons
African-American physicians
African-American centenarians
American centenarians
Men centenarians
United States Army Medical Corps officers
People from Williamson, West Virginia
Physicians from West Virginia
Lincoln University (Pennsylvania) alumni
20th-century surgeons
20th-century African-American scientists
21st-century African-American scientists
United States Army personnel of World War II